Streptomyces alfalfae is a bacterium species from the genus Streptomyces which has been isolated from rhizosphere soil from an alfalfa field in Jingyang in China.

See also 
 List of Streptomyces species

References

Further reading

External links 
Type strain of Streptomyces alfalfae at BacDive -  the Bacterial Diversity Metadatabase

alfalfae
Bacteria described in 2016